was a Japanese swimmer. He competed in the men's 100 metre freestyle event at the 1920 Summer Olympics.

References

External links
 

1895 births
1960 deaths
Olympic swimmers of Japan
Swimmers at the 1920 Summer Olympics
Place of birth missing
Japanese male freestyle swimmers
20th-century Japanese people